= Nguyễn Dương Đôn =

Vietnamese professor

Nguyễn Dương Đôn 阮楊惇
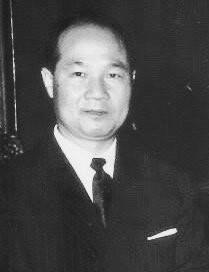

Personal details
- Born: 1 May 1910 Dương Xuân Hạ, Huế
- Died: October 20, 1999 (aged 89)
- Occupation: Politician, professor, diplomat

Nguyễn Dương Đôn (chữ Hán: 阮楊惇, 1 May 1910 – October 20, 1999) was a Vietnamese professor, politician and diplomat. He served as Minister of Education in the government of the State of Vietnam and Envoy to Italy during the Republic of Vietnam era.

== Biography ==
Nguyễn Dương Đôn was born on 1 May 1910 in Dương Xuân Hạ, Huế. His father Nguyễn Dương Thuyên (阮楊恮) was from Hưng Nguyên, Nghệ An.

He studied mathematics at the University of Paris.

He served as director of Education from 1952 to 1954, and then minister of National Education from 1954 to 1955. In 1955, the government of the State of Vietnam was reorganised and Nguyễn Dương Đôn became the Minister of National Education and Youth. In late 1955, he returned to the post of Minister of Education.
